Thorin may refer to:
 Thorin II Oakenshield, a Dwarf in J. R. R. Tolkien's The Hobbit
 Thorin (chemistry), an organic arsenic compound used in the determination of thorium and barium
 Donald E. Thorin (1934–2016), American cinematographer
 Olof Thorin (1912–2004), Swedish mathematician
 Thorin, Germanic name for males, representing the Germanic God Thor